The University of Detroit Mercy is a private Roman Catholic university in Detroit, Michigan. It is sponsored by both the Society of Jesus (Jesuits) and the Sisters of Mercy. The university was founded in 1877 and is the largest Catholic university in Michigan. It has three campuses where it offers more than 100 academic degree programs.

In athletics, the university sponsors 17 NCAA Division I sports for men and women. It is a member of the Horizon League.

History
University of Detroit Mercy's origin dates back to 1877 with the founding of "Detroit College," near Detroit's downtown, by the Society of Jesus, under the leadership of John Baptist Miège, S.J. The college became the University of Detroit in 1911, and in 1927 John P. McNichols, the then-president of the University of Detroit, established a second campus that ended up being known by its Spanish architecture and large elm trees. In 1941, the Sisters of Mercy opened Mercy College of Detroit. Both schools saw a great deal of success and developed many distinguished alumni.

Notable alumni include political and business leaders such as U.S. senator Gary Peters and former Ford CEO Jim Padilla, both from the University of Detroit. In 1990, despite some opposition, these two institutions consolidated to become "University of Detroit Mercy." Since the merger, the university has produced the likes of actor Keegan-Michael Key and news anchor Allison Payne.

The school appointed Donald Taylor as its 26th president in July 2022.

Colleges and campuses

The University of Detroit Mercy comprises seven colleges and schools: 
 School of Architecture and Community Development
 College of Business Administration
 School of Dentistry
 College of Engineering & Science
 College of Health Professions/McAuley School of Nursing
 School of Law
 College of Liberal Arts & Education

The university has three campuses in the city of Detroit:

 The McNichols Campus is at 4001 W. McNichols Road, on the southeast corner of McNichols Road and Livernois Avenue, in northwest Detroit (near the University District, Pilgrim Village and Palmer Woods neighborhoods). The majority of the university's undergraduate and graduate programs are offered on this campus, as well as the university's main administration and athletic facilities like Calihan Hall. It is also the location of all six student residence halls.
 The Riverfront Campus is home to the School of Law in downtown Detroit at 651 East Jefferson (across from the Renaissance Center).
 The Corktown Campus, at 2700 Martin Luther King Jr. Boulevard, has housed the School of Dentistry and Dental Clinic since 2008.

Aside from Detroit Mercy's own campuses, the university offers undergraduate and graduate programs at Macomb University Center in Clinton Township, Mich. Detroit Mercy has also partnered with Aquinas College and St. Mary Mercy Hospital in Grand Rapids, Mich. to offer a Nursing prelicensure program.

A former campus at 8200 West Outer Drive in Detroit was home to Mercy College of Detroit from 1941 until consolidation in 1990. As part of University of Detroit Mercy, the Outer Drive Campus hosted Detroit Mercy's Dentistry Clinic starting in 1997. Detroit Mercy agreed to sell the Outer Drive Campus to WCCCD in 2003, and the Detroit Mercy School of Dentistry and Clinic moved to the Corktown Campus in January 2008.

Academics 

Detroit Mercy's most popular undergraduate majors, in terms of 2021 graduates, were:
Registered Nursing/Registered Nurse (249)
Biology/Biological Sciences (141)
Business Administration & Management (55)
Architectural & Building Sciences (37)
Dental Hygiene/Hygienist (26)
Mechanical Engineering (25)

Admissions

Undergraduate 

Detroit Mercy is considered "selective" by U.S. News & World Report. For the Class of 2025 (enrolling fall 2021), Detroit Mercy received 4,435 applications and accepted 4,135 (93.2%), with 565 enrolling. The middle 50% range of SAT scores for enrolling freshmen was 1063-1250. The middle 50% ACT composite score range was 22-29.

Graduate 

For Fall 2022, the University of Detroit Mercy School of Law received 955 applications and accepted 536 (56.13%). Of those accepted, 209 enrolled, a yield rate of 38.99%. The School of Law had a middle-50% LSAT range of 150-157 for the 2022 first year class.

Law clinics 
In 1965 University of Detroit's Urban Law Clinic was one of the first in the country. It is one of the few law schools in the country requiring a practicum course for all students. It has received numerous awards, most recently the ABA Louis M. Brown Award for Legal Access with Meritorious Recognition in 2012 and the ABA Law Student Division's Judy M. Weightman Memorial Public Interest Award in 2006.

Courses selected for the clinic component bring students in contact with the disadvantaged and disenfranchised, giving all law students at Detroit Mercy first-hand experience of social problems relevant to their specialization. In 2003 the clinic acquired a 28-foot-long mobile law office, perhaps the first such facility in the country. In 2012 a downtown building was purchased and renovated for the clinic, bringing the clinic closer to the court buildings. At that time the clinic courses served over 1000 clients a year.

Detroit Mercy Law students must take one regular, semester-long "clinic" course that places them in contact with the underrepresented in an area of their choice, with options covering most specializations. The courses provide them with the skills and knowledge requisite for their clinical work, together with guided reflection and individual contact with the professor, including a comprehensive final interview.

Following are the clinic courses offered at Detroit Mercy, all of which fulfill the student requirement.
 Immigration Law Clinic. This serves immigrants seeking family sponsorship or Special Immigrant Juvenile Status, or advancing Violence against Women Act Petitions. Students represent clients in U.S. Immigration Court; other court experiences are the U.S. Department of Homeland Security, the Board of Immigration Appeals, and the U.S. Court of Appeals for the Sixth Circuit.
 Veterans Law Clinic. Students argue before the Department of Veterans Affairs for disability benefits for veterans.
 Criminal Trial Clinic. This prepares students for all aspects of defense in misdemeanor cases, including courtroom appearances and plea bargaining.
 Juvenile Appellate Clinic. Students argue cases before a panel of attorneys pre-trial and may be asked to argue the case in the Michigan Court of Appeals. Most cases deal with child protection or delinquency.
 Appellate Advocacy Clinic, State Appellate Defender's Office (SADO). SADO was founded to give "legal representation to indigent criminal defendants in post-conviction matters." Students prepare briefs to be delivered before the Michigan Court of Appeals or the Michigan Supreme Court, and may deliver their brief first in "mock arguments" before a panel of attorneys.
 Intellectual Property Law Clinic. Inventors without the resources to defend themselves before the U.S. Patent and Trademark Office can get help from the law students, supervised by patent attorneys. To be eligible for this clinic students must possess an undergraduate degree in some scientific field. In conjunction with the University of Windsor, the course qualifies students in both U.S. and Canadian patent law, the first certified program in that dual area.

Dental clinics 
The School of Dentistry provides several dental and specialty clinics to the community, including a mobile clinic based in a customized RV. Because the clinics are student clinical programs (where student doctors provide treatment under the supervision of licensed faculty dentists), services can be offered at a reduced cost.

Detroit Collaborative Design Center 
The Detroit Collaborative Design Center (DCDC) is a multi-disciplinary, nonprofit architecture and urban design firm in the School of Architecture.

Institute for North Korean Studies 
The Institute for North Korean Studies (INKS) is a United States-based non-partisan, non-proprietary research center founded at the College of Business Administration at the University of Detroit Mercy in April 2004. INKS is distinguished as the first research center in the United States or Europe to focus exclusively on North Korea. INKS organizes seminars and publishes research and monographs in collaboration with McFarland and Company, Inc., Publishers. The international and interdisciplinary academic journal of the center is North Korean Review.

Carney Latin American Solidarity Archive 
The Padre Guadalupe Carney Latin American Solidarity Archive (CLASA) contains a collection of Spanish and English books, human rights reports, independent newspapers and newsletters, and social justice papers representing more than 25 years of work by individuals and organizations working in solidarity to aid the people of Latin America.

Black Abolitionist Archive 
The Black Abolitionist Archive is a digital collection of over 800 speeches by antebellum African Americans and approximately a thousand editorials from the period, providing a portrait of black involvement in the anti-slavery movement.

Center for Social Entrepreneurship 
The Center for Social Entrepreneurship works to develop the capacity of Detroit enterprises that have a social mission, meaning in addition to regular business goals, they aspire to create social good within their community. The center's main service is the CSE Boost Program, which is an in-person workshop for early-stage social organizations.

Greek life
Fraternities and sororities (in alphabetical order)
Fraternities – Alpha Phi Alpha, Kappa Delta Rho, Lambda Theta Phi, Omega Psi Phi, Phi Beta Sigma, Phi Kappa Theta, Sigma Pi
Sororities – Alpha Kappa Alpha, Delta Sigma Theta, Gamma Phi Beta, Kappa Beta Gamma, Sigma Sigma Sigma, Zeta Phi Beta

Athletics

The University of Detroit Mercy sponsors 17 NCAA Division I-level varsity sports teams. Men's and women's Detroit Mercy Titans teams compete in each sport in the Horizon League, except where noted below:
 Basketball
 Cross country
 Fencing (Midwest Fencing Conference)
 Golf
 Lacrosse (men's: ASUN Conference; women's: Southern Conference)
 Soccer
 Softball (women's team only)
 Track and field (indoor)
 Track and field (outdoor)

The university also sponsors eight intramural sports.

Detroit Mercy's most recent league championship came in 2019, when the women's softball team won the Horizon League Championship. In 2014, both the women's golf team and men's cross country team earned Horizon League titles for the second straight season. The men's lacrosse team won the MAAC Championship in 2013.

In partnership with WADL-TV, the Detroit Mercy Titans launched its own 24-hour network, the Titan Classic Sports Network, in September 2014.

Basketball 
The men's basketball team has consistently contended for the Horizon League title. On June 13, 2018, Detroit Mercy named Mike Davis the 22nd head coach in men's basketball program history. The NCAA tournament-tested Davis previously coached at Texas Southern University, where he led the team to four regular season titles, four conference tournament championships and four NCAA Tournament appearances. He led Indiana University to the 2002 NCAA Championship game.

Ray McCallum coached the Detroit Mercy men's basketball team from 2008 to 2016. He led the Titans to the Horizon League Championship and an NCAA tournament appearance during the 2011–12 season. McCallum's predecessor, Perry Watson, led a successful program at Detroit's Southwestern High School before coming to Detroit Mercy after some years as an assistant coach at the University of Michigan and maintained strong recruiting ties within the city's public league. Watson guided Detroit Mercy to 10 winning seasons, three league titles, two NCAA Tournament appearances and an NIT Final Four during his 15 years with Detroit Mercy. The Titans' two NCAA appearances also included victories over St. John's and UCLA. Between 1997-98 and 2000–01, the Titans had four straight 20-victory seasons.

Dick Vitale, ESPN's most well-known college basketball commentator, was the University of Detroit men's basketball head coach for four seasons (1973–1977) before becoming the school's Athletics Director for 1977–78. The following year he left to coach the Detroit Pistons. In his final year as a college head coach in 1977, Vitale led the Titans to a school record 25 victories and the Round of 16 in the 1977 NCAA tournament before losing to Michigan, 86–81. Vitale ended up with a 78–30 career record as head coach of the Titans. Vitale went on to coach the Detroit Pistons before beginning his broadcasting career with ESPN in 1979 and was the color commentator for the first college basketball game carried by the new network. As its lead college basketball analyst, he helped make the network an integral part of the game's popularity. An author of six books chronicling his love affair with basketball, Vitale received the Basketball Hall of Fame's Curt Gowdy Media Award (1998), won the NABC Cliff Wells Appreciation Award in 2000 and was inducted to the College Basketball Hall of Fame in 2008. In 2011, Detroit Mercy named its basketball court at Calihan Hall in his honor.

Highlights from the Detroit Mercy Titans men's and women's basketball teams include appearances in the 2011-12 postseason. The women's basketball team participated in the WNIT Tournament for the first time ever and finished with its first 20-win season (20-14) since 1997, when the team made its only NCAA Tournament appearance. The men's basketball team captured the 2011-12 Horizon League Championship and reached the NCAA Tournament for the sixth time in its history and first since 1999.

Detroit Mercy has been a host institution for several NCAA Tournament men's basketball games. The university hosted the 2008 NCAA Midwest Regional and 2009 NCAA Final Four, played at Ford Field, as well as the 2018 NCAA First and Second Round games, played at Little Caesar's Arena. In 2021, Detroit Mercy and Oakland University will team up to co-host the 2021 NCAA First and Second Round games, scheduled to be played at Little Caesar's Arena.

All home basketball games feature the Titan Pep Band.

Football 
Detroit Titans football was played from 1896 to 1964. The team staked a claim to college football's national championship with a 9–0 record in 1928. Gus Dorais, coach of the Titans from 1925 to 1942, was inducted in the College Football Hall of Fame in 1954. He also coached the NFL's Detroit Lions.

Notable people
University of Detroit Mercy and its predecessor institutions have graduated or employed many notable people over the years. 

See the main article for some examples:

Photo galleries

McNichols Campus

Corktown Campus (School of Dentistry)

Riverfront Campus (School of Law)

See also

 Detroit Collaborative Design Center of the University of Detroit Mercy
 Roman Catholic Archdiocese of Detroit
 University of Detroit Jesuit High School and Academy had a common early history with the university.
 Detroit Titans track and field
 Detroit Mercy Titans
 List of Jesuit sites

References

Further reading

External links

 
 Detroit Mercy Athletics website
 Library holdings of books, maps, etc, relating to the University of Detroit and the University of Detroit Mercy

 
University of Detroit Mercy
Detroit
Catholic universities and colleges in Michigan
Educational institutions established in 1877
1877 establishments in Michigan
Association of Catholic Colleges and Universities
University of Detroit Mercy
University of Detroit Mercy
University of Detroit Mercy